Wenn Worte meine Sprache wären is the first studio album by German recording artist Tim Bendzko. It was released by Sony Music Columbia on 17 June 2011 in German-speaking Europe. Bendzko worked with music producer Swen Meyer on most of the album which features material that was either written or co-written by himself. Its music incorporates a range of the contemporary rock, folk, and pop music genres with a mix of slow ballads and jazzy uptempo tracks.

Upon its release, Wenn Worte meine Sprache wären established Bendzko as one of the biggest-selling new and upcoming acts of the year. It debuted and peaked at number four on the German Albums Chart and reached the top twenty in Austria and Switzerland. It achieved 5× gold status in Germany and was eventually certified gold and platinum in Austria and Switzerland.

Chart performance
Wenn Worte meine Sprache wären debuted and peaked at number four on the German Albums Chart. It remained ten weeks within the top ten. In October 2011, Bendzko became the first musician to place an album and its first two singles, "Nur noch kurz die Welt retten" and "Wenn Worte meine Sprache wären", within both the German Albums and Singles Chart. In November of the same year, Wenn Worte meine Sprache wären was certified gold by the Bundesverband Musikindustrie (BVMI). By March 2012, it had sold more than 300,000 copies, and in August, the album had reached triple gold status. It was ranked 14th and 47th on the 2011 and 2012 German Year-End Chart, respectively, and has since been certified 5× gold.

Track listing
All songs produced by Swen Meyer.

Charts

Weekly charts

Year-end charts

Decade-end charts

Certifications

Release history

References

External links
 

2011 debut albums
Tim Bendzko albums